Bulgaria–North Macedonia relations are the bilateral relations between the Republic of Bulgaria and the Republic of North Macedonia. Both countries are members of the Council of Europe, and NATO. Bulgaria is a member of the European Union. Bulgaria was the first country to recognize the independence of its neighbour in 1992. Both states signed a friendship treaty in 2017. North Macedonia has been attempting to join the EU since 2004, while EU governments officially gave their permissions to enter accession talks in March 2020. Nevertheless, North Macedonia and Bulgaria have complicated neighborly relations, thus the Bulgarian factor is known in Macedonian politics as "B-complex". 

In 2020, Bulgaria offered a compromise and agreed to recognize the Macedonian language and national identity if North Macedonia would recognize both nations and languages have common historical roots. This proposal was rejected by North Macedonia as threatening. The acknowledgement of Bulgarian influence on the Macedonian history is highly problematic for many Macedonians, because it clashes with the post-WWII Yugoslav Macedonian nation-building narrative, which was based on a deeply anti-Bulgarian stance. Another revisionist strand of the Macedonian historiography is that their national history had already been taken earlier by the Bulgarian national historiography. The resurgence of Bulgarian irredentism due to the deepening of chauvinism and national historical myths in post-Communist Bulgaria has awarded Macedonia a place in Bulgarian nationalism akin to that of Kosovo in Serbian ideology, as Bulgarians are frustrated with the existence of a Macedonian nation, which they consider "artificial", and of a Macedonian language, which they consider a dialect of Bulgarian.

History

Background 
On January 15, 1992, Bulgaria was the first country to recognize the independence of the then-Republic of Macedonia. Bulgaria has however refused to recognize the existence of a separate ethnic Macedonian nation and a separate Macedonian language. It argues that the ethnic Macedonians are a subgroup of the Bulgarian nation, and that the Macedonian language is a Bulgarian dialect. defined by some researchers as pseudoscientific tropes that have been entrenched in Bulgaria since the time of the nationalist-communist regime of Todor Zhivkov, This leads to some complications when signing treaties between the two countries. Such treaties are signed with this long phrase at the end: "done in the official languages of the two states—the Bulgarian language, according to the Constitution of the Republic of Bulgaria, and the Macedonian language, according to the Constitution of the Republic of North Macedonia". On the other hand, Skopje insists on the presence of a Macedonian community in Bulgaria, with some circles stating 750,000 'ethnic Macedonians' there and treats as "ethnic Macedonians" a number of figures from Bulgarian history from the region during the period from the 9th century to the end of the Second World War. North Macedonia has developed its relations with Bulgaria in the political, economic, and military spheres. The governments of the two countries have worked to improve business relations. Bulgaria has also donated tanks, artillery, and other military technology to the Army of North Macedonia. The rules governing good neighbourly relations agreed between Bulgaria and North Macedonia were set in the Joint Declaration of February 22, 1999 reaffirmed by a joint memorandum signed on January 22, 2008, in Sofia.

Reacting to the publication of a controversial encyclopedia by the Macedonian Academy of Sciences and Arts (MANU) in 2009, Bulgaria warned that "it is unacceptable for a country aspirant for NATO and EU membership to resort to terminology typical for the ideology of the Cold War era," and that the encyclopedia "gives no contribution to the strengthening of the neighborly relations and curbing down of 'hate speech'." In connection with the administrative, police and other types of pressure allegedly being exercised on citizens of Bulgaria and citizens of North Macedonia with Bulgarian self-identification in North Macedonia, on August 4, 2009, the Bulgarian Foreign Ministry declared that "Bulgaria will examine the approach of the Macedonian side in such cases as one of the criteria on the basis of which to assess the country's readiness to make the changes that would allow the European integration of the Republic of North Macedonia." Bulgaria has proposed to sign a treaty (based on that 1999 Joint Declaration) guaranteeing the good neighbourly relations between the two countries, in order to enable Bulgarian support for the accession of North Macedonia to the European Union. During the last few years, thousands of citizens of North Macedonia have applied for Bulgarian citizenship (amongst them North Macedonia's former PM Ljubco Georgievski), with more than 90,000 having already received Bulgarian passports. In order to obtain the passport, the citizens of North Macedonia who apply for Bulgarian citizenship must prove that they have Bulgarian origins and a Bulgarian national consciousness. Between January 1 to November 18, 2011, the Bulgarian Council for citizenship considered 22,241 applications for citizenship, of which 13,607 were approved.

Friendship treaty and beyond 
The Governments of Bulgaria and North Macedonia signed a friendship treaty to bolster the relations between the two Balkan states on 1 August, 2017. The so-called Treaty of Friendship, Good-Neighbourliness and Cooperation was ratified by the Parliaments of the Republic of North Macedonia and Bulgaria on 15 and 18 January 2018, respectively. A joint commission on historical and educational issues was formed in 2018 to serve as a forum where controversial, historical and educational issues could be raised and discussed. According to the reports, this commission has made little progress in its work for a period of one year.

In October 2019, Bulgaria set out a "framework position", warning that it would block the EU accession process unless North Macedonia fulfilled a number of demands regarding what Bulgaria perceived as "anti-Bulgarian ideology" in the country. In October 2020, Bulgaria offered a compromise and agreed to recognize the Macedonian language and Macedonian identity if North Macedonia recognizes that they historically had Bulgarian roots. Foreign Minister Ekaterina Zaharieva said that "just as we are ready to acknowledge the reality, so must they acknowledge the past." This proposal was rejected by North Macedonia. Macedonian President Pendarovski and Prime Minister Zaev announced that they were neither negotiating nor would ever negotiate whether the Macedonian language and identity were related historically to Bulgaria. As a result, on November 17, 2020, Bulgaria refused to approve the European Union's negotiation framework for North Macedonia, effectively blocking the official start of accession talks with this country. Germany and the EU institutions criticized Sofia's unconstructive behavior. According to Polish political scientist Tomasz Kamusella, Bulgaria's EU membership should not be weaponized as an instrument of pressure on EU candidate states to spread Bulgarian ethnopolitical influence across the region, from Moldova to North Macedonia and Albania.

In an interview with Bulgarian media in November 2020, Prime Minister Zoran Zaev acknowledged many historical facts about the common history of both peoples that have been altered and concealed for decades in North Macedonia. The interview sparked controversy and was followed by a wave of nationalism in Skopje, as well by protests demanding Zaev's resignation. According to the opinion of the former Macedonian Prime Minister Ljubčo Georgievski, who insists on the Bulgarian roots of the Macedonians, these reactions were the result of ignorance, hypocrisy or politicking. He noted that the “deep state” in North Macedonia disrupted the normal relations between the two countries. It built hatred and enmity towards Bulgaria. On the other hand, another former Prime Minister Vlado Buckovski, who was appointed as Zaev's envoy to Bulgaria, also had strong pro-Bulgarian positions and claims Macedonians and Bulgarians were a single people, separated intentionally by the Yugoslav policy during the 20th century. Expressions of anti-Bulgarian sentiment remain a serious concern with the repeated burning of Bulgarian flags. These actions have been condemned strongly by Stevo Pendarovski, President of North Macedonia, and by Ekaterina Zakharieva, Foreign Minister of Bulgaria. In late March 2021, a scandal erupted in Bulgaria after it was discovered that the North Macedonian government under Zoran Zaev had been funding an institute called the International Institute for Middle East and Balkan Studies (IFIMES) between 2017 and 2020. IFIMES published a number of articles that described Bulgaria and Germany as “mafia states interested in Nazism”. This was perceived in Bulgaria as a defamation campaign funded by North Macedonia in order to discredit Bulgaria in front of its EU partners. The government of North Macedonia has denied these claims by the Bulgarian side. On 24 January, 2022, the two new prime ministers,  Kiril Petkov of Bulgaria and Dimitar Kovačevski of North Macedonia, met in Skopje, seeking to improve relations talks and discussing EU negotiations and other issues to resolve. On 24 June 2022, under heavy EU pressure, Bulgaria's parliament approved the lifting of the country's veto on opening EU accession talks with North Macedonia.

Russian incitement of anti-Bulgarian sentiments in North Macedonia 
On May 9, 2015, on the occasion of the attack by Albanian terrorists in the city of Kumanovo, the Putin-awarded and Russian intelligence agent, as well as pro-Kremlin journalist Daria Aslamova published a commissioned article in the newspaper "Komsomolskaya Pravda", in which there was a map of "united Macedonia", including the "liberated" Pirin part of the region, which was declared "occupied" by Bulgaria. Bulgaria was accused of "supporting Albanian terrorists", regardless of the Bulgarian support it provided to the defense of Macedonia in 2001 and was declared "banished" from Orthodox civilization.  On May 24, 2017, in the presence of the president of the then Republic of Macedonia, Gjorge Ivanov, Putin called the Cyrillic alphabet "Macedonian", for which he was also criticized by alternative media in Russia itself. The Russian Embassy in Skopje, on the other hand, published Facebook posts in which historical figures from the region of Macedonia with undeniable Bulgarian self-awareness such as the Miladinovi Brothers, Clement of Ohrid, Gotse Delchev and others, were presented as "ethnic Macedonians", and present the IMRO, which had a Bulgarian character and until the defeat of Bulgaria in the First World War, fought for the accession of Macedonia to it, as an "ethnic Macedonian" revolutionary organization. It has also supported a film presenting the Cyrillic alphabet as "Macedonian", and quoted Putin's words about it on Facebook, in which even the entry of the Bulgarian army into Vardar Macedonia, after the defeat of the Kingdom of Yugoslavia by the Wehrmacht during the Second World War, is presented as a "Bulgarian aggression" against Macedonia, despite the fact that in Yugoslavia, Macedonia at that time was officially declared as "Southern Serbia". The majority of its inhabitants welcomed the Bulgarian troops as liberators, and as a result of the Molotov–Ribbentrop Pact, the USSR was then also an ally of Nazi Germany, and the "reason" for the German attack on the Soviet Union.

See also
 Foreign relations of Bulgaria
 Foreign relations of North Macedonia 
 Accession of North Macedonia to the European Union
 Macedonians in Bulgaria 
 Bulgarians in North Macedonia
 Bulgaria–Yugoslavia relations

References

 
North Macedonia
Bilateral relations of North Macedonia